= Hypamblys =

Scientific classification
- Domain: Eukaryota
- Kingdom: Animalia
- Phylum: Arthropoda
- Class: Insecta
- Order: Hymenoptera
- Family: Ichneumonidae
- Genus: Hypamblys; Förster, 1869

Genus of insects

Hypamblys is a genus of parasitoid wasps belonging to the family Ichneumonidae.

The species of this genus are found in Europe and Northern America.

Species:

- Hypamblys albicruris (Gravenhorst, 1829)
- Hypamblys albifacies (Provancher, 1888)
